2022 PDC Calendar may refer to:

 2022 PDC Calendar (January–April)
 2022 PDC Calendar (May–August)
 2022 PDC Calendar (September–December)